There have been two baronetcies created for persons with the surname Salt, both in the Baronetage of the United Kingdom. Both titles are extant as of 2007.

The Salt Baronetcy, of Saltaire in the County of York, was created in the Baronetage of the United Kingdom on 30 October 1869 for the manufacturer, benefactor and Liberal politician Titus Salt.

The Salt Baronetcy, of Standon, and of Weeping Cross in the County of Stafford, was created in the Baronetage of the United Kingdom on 8 August 1899 for Thomas Salt, a banker and Conservative Member of Parliament for Stafford for many years.  Other members of the family may also be mentioned:- William Salt (1808–1863) was a banker and denealogist. Harold Francis Salt (1879–1971), youngest son of the first Baronet, was a major general in the army. James Frederick Thomas George Salt (1940-3 Dec 2009), son of George Stevenson Salt, second son of the second Baronet, was a rear admiral in the Royal Navy.

Salt baronets, of Saltaire (1869)
Sir Titus Salt, 1st Baronet (1803–1876)
Sir William Henry Salt, 2nd Baronet (1831–1892)
Sir Shirley Harris Salt, 3rd Baronet (1857–1920)
Sir John William Titus Salt, 4th Baronet (1884–1953)
Sir David Shirley Salt, 5th Baronet (1930–1978)
Sir Anthony Houlton Salt, 6th Baronet (1931–1991)
Sir Patrick MacDonnell Salt, 7th Baronet (born 1932)
The heir presumptive is Daniel Alexander Salt (born 1943), a descendant of the first baronet.

Salt baronets, of Standon and Weeping Cross (1899)
Sir Thomas Salt, 1st Baronet (1830–1904)
Sir Thomas Anderson Salt, 2nd Baronet (1863–1940) High Sheriff of Staffordshire 1909.
Sir Thomas Henry Salt, 3rd Baronet (1905–1965)
Sir (Thomas) Michael John Salt, 4th Baronet (born 1946)
The heir presumptive is Anthony William David Salt (born 1950), brother of the 4th baronet.

References
Kidd, Charles, Williamson, David (editors). Debrett's Peerage and Baronetage (1990 edition). New York: St Martin's Press, 1990.

Salt